Zosimus the Bearded (Зосима Брадатый in Russian) (died 1494) was Metropolitan of Moscow and all Rus' from 1490 to 1494. He was the fifth Metropolitan in Moscow to be appointed  without the approval of the Ecumenical Patriarch of Constantinople as had been the norm. For the first time in Russian history, Zosimus was appointed metropolitan by the decision of the council of the Russian bishops by order of the Grand Prince Ivan III. 

He was the author of the Third Rome conception. He had been archimandrite of the Simonovskii Monastery in Moscow when he was picked to replace Metropolitan Gerontii some six months after Gerontii's death.

Archbishop Gennady of Novgorod had uncovered the Heresy of the Judaizers in 1487 and Zosimus's entire metropolitanate was overshadowed by this crisis.  Gennady wrote a letter in 1490 to Zosimus and other bishops in the Russian church demanding a council be convened and the heresy be dealt with. The council convened less than a month after Zosimus' elevation to the metropolitan throne and condemned the heresy.  Gennady demanded that the heretics be severely punished - hanged and burned - and not merely incarcerated, but Zosimus and Grand Prince Ivan III opposed these harsher methods. Zosimus was eventually accused of being a secret heretic and, on 17 May 1494, he was removed from the metropolitan throne on charges of heresy and sodomy.  He died before any trial was held.

Zosimus is known for having compiled a list of banned books and written an epistle against heretics.

References

Metropolitans of Kiev and all Rus' (Patriarchate of Moscow)
1494 deaths
Year of birth unknown
Place of birth unknown